The  is a Bo-Bo-Bo wheel arrangement AC electric locomotive type operated by Japanese National Railways (JNR) in Japan from 1961 until the 1980s. 81 locomotives were built by Hitachi and Mitsubishi between 1961 and 1965.

Variants
 EF70-0: Numbers EF70 1 – 81
 EF70-1000: Numbers EF70 1001 – 1007 renumbered from EF70 22 to 28 in 1968

Design
The locomotives had two PS100A pantographs, but normally operated with only the rear pantograph raised.

Locomotive numbers EF70 22 onward (built from 1964) incorporated minor design changes, including two roof-mounted headlights replacing the original centrally-mounted single headlight, and changes to the cabside window design.

History
In 1968, seven locomotives, EF70 22 to 28, were modified for use on sleeping car services, and were renumbered EF70 1001 to 1007.

With the introduction of Class EF81 multi-voltage AC/DC electric locomotives, many of the Class EF70 locomotives became surplus, and numbers 61 to 81 were transferred to Kyushu in 1980 to replace Class ED72 and Class ED73 AC locomotives, but they themselves were soon replaced.

By 1984, only a small number of the class remained in service on the Hokuriku Main Line, with most of the class removed from service coinciding with the March 1985 timetable revision. All of the class except EF70 1 were officially withdrawn in March 1986, and EF70 1 was finally withdrawn in March 1987.

Preserved examples
, two members of the class are preserved: EF70 57, together with camping carriages at a youth facility in Hakusan, Ishikawa, and EF70 1001 at the Usui Pass Railway Heritage Park in Gunma Prefecture.

The camping facility where EF70 57 is preserved closed in March 2013, and cutting up of the camping coaches commenced in February 2016.

Classification

The EF70 classification for this locomotive type is explained below.
 E: Electric locomotive
 F: Six driving axles
 7x: AC locomotive with maximum speed exceeding

References

20 kV AC locomotives
Electric locomotives of Japan
Bo-Bo-Bo locomotives
1067 mm gauge locomotives of Japan
Railway locomotives introduced in 1961
Hitachi locomotives
Mitsubishi locomotives